Sali Mali is a popular Welsh children's book and television character, originally created by author Mary Vaughan Jones and illustrated by Rowena Wyn Jones during the 1960s and 1970s. Many Welsh-speaking children learnt to read by reading Sali Mali books.

Books
Following the death of Mary Vaughan Jones, many of her original books were re-published. The copyright belonged to Cymdeithas Lyfrau Ceredigion until the publisher was bought by Gomer Press in 2009. 
Characters are:
Sali Mali
Jac Do (Jackdaw)
Jaci Soch
Jac y Jwc
Jini
Tomos Caradog (Thomas Caradog)
Nicw Nacw
Pry Bach Tew
Siani Flewog
Dwmplen Malwoden
Morgan and Magi Ann
Mop Golchi Llestri (Dish Washing Mop)
Llwy Bren (Wooden Spoon)
Sosban Fach (Small Saucepan)

Many new titles for children were authored by Dylan Williams and illustrated by Simon Bradbury. One of these books courted controversy in December 2007, when Sali Mali a'r Hwdi Chwim was published, in the story Sali Mali's iPod is stolen by a hoodie. Several bookshops boycotted the book by refusing to stock it.

Television series
An animated Sali Mali series was produced by Siriol Productions and Cymru Cyfru and Calon for S4C in 2000. The theme tune to this was sung by Cerys Matthews (Angharad Bisby in some versions), and the series is narrated by Rhys Ifans. Sali Mali had broadcast in English on Nickelodeon. The show also aired on Channel 4 and has also been sold to Scandinavian counties.

A preschool children's television series, Caffi Sali Mali, was produced by Siânco for S4C in 1994. There was also a spin-off of this series called Slot Syniadau Sali. It was written by Ifana Savill using the characters created by Mary Vaughan Jones, including Sali Mali's pet bird, Jac-do, and her good friend, Jac y Jwc. This series is produced using actors in costumes and puppets. Sali Mali runs a cafe in the small village of "Pentre Bach" (English Little Village). A follow-up series, Pentre Bach, which consisted of 52 episodes and aired on 6 September 2004, was filmed using a purpose-built village, located in Blaenpennal, which is also a guest centre run by Ifana and Adrian Savill. The rights to the series were bought by Al-Jazeera in April 2006, to be shown across the Middle East in Arabic.

Languages are:

 English
 German
 Danish
 Welsh
 Arabic
 Norwegian
 Spanish
 Polish
 Korean
 Scot Gaelic

Episodes

 Autumn Leaves
 Little Lamb Lost
 Dirty Feet
 Time Flies
 Windy Day
 Stowaway Guest
 Leaving Home
 Christmas Eve
 Digging for Treasure
 Splash Day
 Wet Paint
 Hot and Bothered
 Playing in the Snow
 Snowed In
 Hide and Eek
 Who Ate The Lettuce?
 Twins
 Hot Day
 Say Cheese
 Lost Friends
 Easter Eggstravaganza
 Blackberry Belly
 A Model Model
 Chimney Weep
 Snow Fun
 Mushroom Madness
 Have An Ice-Day
 Feeding the Birds
 Sing Along A-Sali
 Achoo
 Naughty Day
 Spring Clean
 Mama Jackdaw
 One, Two, Three
 At The Seaside
 Let's Go Camping
 Happy Birthday, Jackdaw
 Falling Leaves
 Bake A Cake
 Balloon Race
 How Does Your Garden Grow
 The Storm
 The Visitors
 Snap!
 Making Music
 The New Teddy
 Sticky Toffee
 Boo!
 Making Masks
 Keep Fit
 All Tied Up
 He's Been Framed

References

A list of the Sali Mali titles currently in print can be found at http://www.gomer.co.uk/index.php/books-for-children/sali-mali.html

Welsh children's literature
British children's animated television shows
Television shows based on children's books
2000s British animated television series
2000s British children's television series
S4C original programming
Nick Jr. original programming
Channel 4 original programming
English-language television shows
1969 children's books